Eslamabad-e Chahar Gavareh (also Romanized as Eslāmābād-e Chahār Gavāreh; also known as Eslāmābād) is a village in Tabadkan Rural District, in the Central District of Mashhad County, Razavi Khorasan Province, Iran. At the 2006 census, its population was 573, in 149 families.

References 

Populated places in Mashhad County